Douglas Edmund Young (7 May 1917 – 27 December 1995) was an English cricketer.  Young was a right-handed batsman who bowled leg break.  He was born at Wandsworth, London and educated at King's College School, Wimbledon.

While studying at Brasenose College, Oxford, Young made his first-class debut for Oxford University Cricket Club against Glamorgan in 1938.  He made nineteen further first-class appearances for the university, the last of which came against the Marylebone Cricket Club in 1939. He was awarded a Blue in 1938 but in 1939 he played right up the University Match but was left out of the side for the actual game, when he was twelfth man.

In his 20 first-class appearances, Young scored 442 runs at an average of 17.68, with a high score of 36.  It was though with the ball that he stood out, taking 50 wickets at a bowling average of 27.48, with best figures of 6/58.  One of two five wicket hauls he took, these figures came against Lancashire in 1938.

Following World War II, Young played second XI cricket for Surrey, though could not force his way into their first team.  In 1953 he joined Berkshire, making his debut against Cornwall in the Minor Counties Championship.  He played Minor counties cricket for Berkshire from 1953 to 1959, making 49 appearances.

He died at Exeter, Devon on 27 December 1995.

References

External links
Douglas Young at ESPNcricinfo
Douglas Young at CricketArchive

1917 births
1995 deaths
People from Wandsworth
People educated at King's College School, London
Alumni of Brasenose College, Oxford
English cricketers
Oxford University cricketers
Berkshire cricketers